Flörsheim (or Flörsheim am Main) is a town in Hesse, Germany.

Florsheim can also mean:
 Florsheim (surname)
 Flörsheim-Dalsheim, including Nieder-Flörsheim, commune in Rheinland-Pfalz, Germany
 Ober-Flörsheim, commune in Rheinland-Pfalz, Germany
 Florsheim Shoes, American shoe company